Poly((R)-hydroxyalkanoic acid) depolymerase may refer to:
 Poly(3-hydroxybutyrate) depolymerase, an enzyme
 Poly(3-hydroxyoctanoate) depolymerase, an enzyme